Liahchycy - a village in Belarus. Located 15 kilometers from the Kobrin and 65 kilometers from Brest. According to legend, close to the village on a hill buried Volhynian Vladimir Princess Olga Romanovna.

First mentioned in historical records from 1563. In 1795 the village, along with the rest of eastern Poland, was annexed by the Russian Empire in the effect of the Partitions of Poland.  Between 1921 and 1939 it was part of Poland. In 1939 the Soviet Union retook the town, and attached it to the Byelorussian SSR. Between 1941 and 1944 it was occupied by Nazi Germany, until the liberation by the Red Army in 1944. Since 1991 it is a part of independent Belarus.

Population growth

References

External links
 Фотографии Ляхчыц на Radzima.net.
 Вид Ляхчиц со спутника.
 Ляхчицы на карте Хидринского сельсовета.
 Памяць: Кобрынскі раён / Гісторыка-дакументальныя хронікі гарадоў і раёнаў Беларусі. Мінск: БЕЛТА, 2002.

Villages in Belarus
Populated places in Brest Region
Grodno Governorate
Polesie Voivodeship